The Messerschmitt Bf 162 was a light bomber aircraft designed in Germany prior to World War II, which flew only in prototype form.

Design and development
The Bf 162 was designed in response to a 1935 RLM (Reichsluftfahrtministerium, Reich Aviation Ministry) specification for a schnellbomber ("fast bomber") for tactical use. Messerschmitt's design was a modified Bf 110 with a glazed nose to accommodate a bombardier. In 1937, three prototypes were flown against rival designs, the Junkers Ju 88 and the Henschel Hs 127, both entirely new aircraft.

It was eventually decided that the Ju 88 be selected for production, and development of the Bf 162 ended. As a disinformation tactic, images of the Bf 162 were widely circulated in the German press, captioned as the "Messerschmitt Jaguar", a name never used outside this context.

This aircraft's RLM official airframe number of 8-162 was later re-used for the Heinkel He 162 jet fighter.

Specifications (Bf 162)

See also

References

Green, William. Warplanes of the Third Reich. New York:Doubleday, 1972. .
Wagner, Ray and Heinz Nowarra. German Combat Planes: A Comprehensive Survey and History of the Development of German Military Aircraft from 1914 to 1945. New York: Doubleday, 1971.

External links

 German Aviation 1919 - 1945

Bf 162
1930s German bomber aircraft
Abandoned military aircraft projects of Germany
Low-wing aircraft
Aircraft first flown in 1937
Twin piston-engined tractor aircraft
Twin-tail aircraft